is a city located in Ibaraki Prefecture, Japan. , the city had an estimated population of 99,987 in 37,635 households and a population density of 487 persons per km2. The percentage of the population aged over 65 was 31.2%.

Geography
Located in southwestern Ibaraki Prefecture, Chikusei is located on the west side of Mount Tsukuba and is bordered by Tochigi Prefecture to the north. The Kinugawa River and the Kokaigawa River flow through the city. The city is located about 43 miles north of downtown Tokyo. Except for the hills with an altitude of about 200 meters connected to the Abukuma mountains at the northeastern end, almost the entire area is flat land with an elevation of about 66 to 197 feet or extremely gentle hills, and about 95% of the total area of the city is residential or cultivated. rice paddies occupy about 40% of the total area of the city.

Surrounding municipalities
Ibaraki Prefecture
 Yūki
 Shimotsuma
 Tsukuba
 Sakuragawa
 Yashiyo
Tochigi Prefecture
Oyama
Mooka

Climate
Chikusei has a Humid continental climate (Köppen Cfa) characterized by warm summers and cool winters with light snowfall.

Demographics
Per Japanese census data, the population of Chikusei peaked around 1990 and has steadily declined since.

History
During the Edo period, parts of the modern city of Chikusei were administered by Shimodate Domain, one of the feudal domains of the Tokugawa shogunate. With the creation of the modern municipalities system after the Meiji Restoration on April 1, 1889, the town of Shimodate was established within Makabe District, Ibaraki). Shimodate was raised to city status on March 15, 1954.

The city of Chikusei was established on March 28, 2005, from the merger of the city of Shimodate, and towns of Akeno, Kyōwa and Sekijō (all from Makabe District).

Government
Chikusei has a mayor-council form of government with a directly elected mayor and a unicameral city council of 24 members. Chikusei contributes two members to the Ibaraki Prefectural Assembly. In terms of national politics, the city is part of Ibaraki 1st district of the lower house of the Diet of Japan.

Economy
Chikusei has traditionally had  strong agricultural economy, with noted products including koshihikari rice, nashi pears, small watermelons, cucumbers, strawberries, and tomatoes. Taking advantage of the location near the Tokyo metropolitan area and with abundant wide flat land, multiple industrial parks were created from the 1980s, forming a part of the Kanto inland industrial area. It is also within commuting range for to the cities of southern Tochigi Prefecture.

Education
Chikusei has 20 public elementary schools and seven public middle schools operated by the city government, and four public high schools operated by the Ibaraki Prefectural Board of Education. These is also one private middle school and one private high school.

Transportation

Railway
 JR East – Mito Line
 -  -  - 
Kantō Railway – Jōsō Line
 -  - 
 Mooka Railway
 -  -  -

Highway
  (nearest interchange is Mooka IC in neighboring Mooka)]

Local attractions
site of Seki Castle (national historic landmark)
site of Isa Castle
Funatama kofun
site of Kogeta Castle
site of Shimodate Castle
Shimodate Gion Festival

Noted people from Chikusei
Hazan Itaya, ceramist
Norihiko Akagi, politician
Shingo Katayama, golfer
Yōko Teppōzuka, voice actress

References

External links

Official Website 

Cities in Ibaraki Prefecture
Chikusei